The Port of Naantali is a port located in the south-west of Finland, city of Naantali, where the mainland meets the beginning of the Turku archipelago. The port is among the largest in Finland in terms of passenger and cargo volume. The Port of Naantali's main volumes deriving from the liquid and dry bulk materials and ferry goods.

The port consists of three parts: Main Harbour, Luonnonmaa Harbour (which is located next to the Turku Repair Yard) and the Oil Harbour for Neste's Naantali refinery; all of which are managed by the Port of Naantali. At present, the port has both freight and passenger traffic and the connection from Naantali to Kapellskär in Sweden is operated by Finnlines.

The main entrance channel Naantalin väylä is 120 kilometres long and starts southern of Utö.

External links

Official website 

Naantali
Naantali
Buildings and structures in Southwest Finland